Jos De Beukelaere (7 April 1925 – 5 November 1969) was a Belgian cyclist. He competed in the team pursuit event at the 1948 Summer Olympics.

References

External links
 

1925 births
1969 deaths
Belgian male cyclists
Olympic cyclists of Belgium
Cyclists at the 1948 Summer Olympics
Cyclists from Antwerp